The Pantalla de Cristal Fest is a major international film festival located in Mexico City. The festival features over two hundred digital films, shorts, musical videoclips, TV spots and documentaries over the course of seven days.

History
The Festival was established in 1999 by José Antonio Fernández, founder of the Mexican film magazine Screen. Eight categories of awards were included in its most recent edition: for feature films, documentaries, short films, video clips, commercials, newspaper reports, corporate videos, television series and miniseries.

See also
 Film festivals in North and Central America

References

External links
 Official website for the Festival Pantalla de Cristal
This work contains a translation derived from «Pantalla de Cristal Film Festival» of the Italian Wikipedia, published by its editors under the GNU Free Documentation License and Creative Commons Attribution Share-Alike 3.0 Unported License.
Film festivals in Mexico
Tourist attractions in Mexico City